Katalin Nemes (born Katalin Frieder; 5 October 1915) was a pianist and teacher. She was the wife of the writer and journalist György Nemes and the mother of the literary translator Anna Nemes.

From the age of 10 she attended the conservatory of Debrecen as a student of Margit Halácsy. From 1932 to 1937 she attended Franz Liszt Academy of Music and was taught by Imre Stefániai, Béla Bartók and Imre Keéri-Szántó. During this period she had to play on piano in a band. After getting degree, she married György Nemes.

She taught at Nemzeti Zenede from 1947 to 1949, and then between 1949 and 1951 at Musical Secondary Grammar School at Budapest. At this time she returned to the academy as a demonstrator. Later she became a professor; her primary subject was related to piano.

At the same time she was a leader of concerts.

Sources
 Brockhaus–Riemann zenei lexikon. Szerk. Boronkay Antal 2. köt. Budapest, 1984. Zeneműkiadó 
 Így láttuk Bartókot. Ötvennégy emlékezés. Szerk. Bónis Ferenc. Budapest, 1995. Püski K. 
 Ki kicsoda a magyar zeneéletben? Szerk. Székely András. 2. kiad. Budapest, 1988. Zeneműkiadó. 
  Az ő és férje oldala a Fővárosi Szabó Ervin Könyvtár honlapján

References 

1915 births
1991 deaths
Hungarian pianists
Hungarian women pianists
People from Debrecen
Academic staff of the Franz Liszt Academy of Music
20th-century pianists
20th-century women pianists